Kissane is an Irish surname, particularly associated with County Kerry. It originates as an anglicisation of the Irish surname Ó Cíosáin, which was also anglicised as Cashman–the anglicisation of Kissane is more popular in County Kerry, while Cashman is more popular in County Cork.

Notable people with the surname Kissane include:
Andy Kissane
David Kissane
Eamon Kissane
Edward Kissane
Jack Kissane (1936-2022), Irish Gaelic footballer and army officer
Jim Kissane
Paudie Kissane
Richard Kissane

References 

Surnames of Irish origin